John Heinricy (born 19 November 1947) is a U.S. automotive engineer and noted racecar driver. He had a long and distinguished career at General Motors, serving as Director of the GM Performance Division before retiring from GM in October 2008. He also has a sub 8 minute time in a 2009 Cadillac CTS-V around the Nürburgring.

Racing record

SCCA National Championship Runoffs

References

External links
Driver DB Profile

American racing drivers
American automotive engineers
General Motors executives
Trans-Am Series drivers
American Le Mans Series drivers
Living people
SCCA National Championship Runoffs winners
1947 births